The 1995–96 Eredivisie season was the 36th season of the Eredivisie, the top level of ice hockey in the Netherlands. Six teams participated in the league, and the Tilburg Trappers won the championship.

Regular season 
 
(* The Dordrecht Lions had two points deducted)

Playoffs

External links 
 Season on hockeyarchives.info

Neth
Eredivisie (ice hockey) seasons
Ere 
Ere